A Grim Becoming is a 2014 American horror comedy film directed by Adam R. Steigert. The film had its world premiere on October 31, 2014, and stars Brandyn T. Williams as a young businessman that finds he has become a Grim Reaper. Including writing, production for A Grim Becoming took place over a two and a half year period, with filming taking place in New York during the summer of 2013.

Synopsis
Raphael (Brandyn T. Williams) is an executive on the cusp of either making it big or losing it all, depending on how a deal with a large distribution company goes. His co-worker Wayne (Britt Griffith) would love to see Raphael fail so he can himself progress within the business, a situation that is made worse when Raphael must take time off of work to go to the funeral of a family member in Metzburgh. On his way to Metzburgh, Raphael witnesses a Grim Reaper claiming a soul and ends up becoming a Grim Reaper himself. Raphael now has to find out what he's willing to do to get this status reversed and what Death (Michael Sciabarrasi) himself has planned for him.

Cast

 Brandyn T. Williams as Raphael (as Brandon Williams)
 Michael Sciabarrasi as Magoo / Death
 Bill Oberst Jr. as Phill Looney
 Britt Griffith as Wayne
 Jessica Cameron as Life
 Melantha Blackthorne as Meyrl Looney
 Devanny Pinn as Jamie
 Lynn Lowry as Mother
 Jason John Beebe as Vinny Gognitti

Reception
A staff member for Horror-movies.ca gave an overly favorable review for A Grim Becoming, commenting that while there were issues with sound that they overall enjoyed the film and believed that it could become a cult classic. In contrast Nerdly panned the film, criticizing it for its "childish jokes" and "technical issues as well which destroy any redeeming qualities that this film might have had."

References

External links

 

2014 films
2014 horror films
2014 comedy horror films
American comedy horror films
Films shot in New York (state)
2014 comedy films
2010s English-language films
Films directed by Adam R. Steigert
2010s American films